Plague Over England is a play written by Nicholas de Jongh, based on a real-life incident when actor John Gielgud was arrested for lewd behavior in 1953; it provides an insight into the changes in the lives of gay people over the last fifty years. It received universally positive reviews when it received its world premiere at the Finborough Theatre in 2008, and subsequently transferred to the West End with an updated cast for a limited run.

Plot summary
On 21 October 1953, John Gielgud was arrested in a public lavatory after being entrapped by a "pretty policeman". There followed a high-profile court case, reenacted in Plague Over England.

Productions

The Evening Standard critic Nicholas de Jongh's first play premiered at the Finborough Theatre in February 2008, and transferred to the West End's Duchess Theatre in February 2009, with Michael Feast as Gielgud and Celia Imrie as Sybil Thorndike. It included the following cast: Michael Brown, David Burt, Simon Dutton, Steven Hansell, Sam Heughan, Hugh Ross and John Warnaby. It was directed by Tamara Harvey.

Reception
The production received largely positive reviews, many particularly praising Imrie and Feast. However, despite rave reviews, the production closed two weeks early on 2 May 2009.

Critic quotes
"...Michael Feast, who knew Gielgud personally, gives a beautifully deft tragi-comic performance as the great actor, at once unworldly, lecherous, self-mocking and full of fear...Celia Imrie offers a delicious double as a touchingly sympathetic Sybil Thorndike... bravo!" Charles Spencer, Daily Telegraph.
"Lively...arresting." Benedict Nightingale, The Times.
"Compelling...a terrific first play." The Evening Standard.
"Bracing, moving and intelligent" Sunday Express.

References

External links
 
 
 

2008 plays
West End plays
Plays based on actual events
Fringe theatre
British plays
LGBT-related plays